Kampeska is an unincorporated community in Codington County, in the U.S. state of South Dakota.

History
Kampeska was platted in 1883. The community took its name from nearby Lake Kampeska. The Kampeska post office closed in 1928.

Notable people
Arthur C. Mellette, (resided on Lake Kampeska), first Governor of South Dakota and last Governor of the Dakota Territory.
Fred H. Hildebrandt, (resided on Lake Kampeska), U.S. Representative from South Dakota.

References

Unincorporated communities in Codington County, South Dakota
Unincorporated communities in South Dakota